Korma or qorma is a dish originating in the Indian subcontinent, consisting of meat or vegetables braised with yogurt (dahi), water or stock, and spices to produce a thick sauce or gravy.

Etymology
The English name is an anglicisation of Hindi-Urdu qormā (क़ोरमा, قورمہ), meaning "braise". It refers to the cooking technique used in the dish. All these words, and the names of dishes such as the Iranian ghormeh, Turkish Kavurma and the Azerbaijani qovurma or kavarma, are ultimately derived from a Turkic word qawirma, meaning "[a] fried thing". The Indian korma is, however, possibly unrelated in a culinary sense to the modern Turkish kavurma or to some other dishes using the same root word, as they use widely varying techniques and ingredients.

History

Korma has its roots in the Mughlai cuisine of the Indian subcontinent. A characteristic Mughal dish, it can be traced back to the 16th century and to the Mughal expansion into South Asia. Kormas were often prepared in the Mughal court kitchens, such as the famous white korma, perhaps garnished with vark, said to have been served to Shah Jahan and his guests at the inauguration of the Taj Mahal.

Classically, a korma is defined as a dish where meat or vegetables are braised with yogurt or stock. The technique covers many different styles of korma. The flavour of a korma is based on a mixture of spices, including ground coriander and cumin, combined with yogurt kept below curdling temperature and incorporated slowly and carefully with the meat juices. Traditionally, this would have been carried out in a pot set over a very low fire, with charcoal on the lid to provide all-round heat. A korma can be mildly spiced or fiery and may use lamb, goat meat, chicken, beef or game; some kormas combine meat and vegetables such as spinach and turnip. The term Shahi, used for some kormas indicates its status as a prestige dish, rather than an everyday meal, and its association with the court.

Preparation

The korma style is similar to other braising techniques in that the meat or vegetable is first cooked briskly, or seared, using a high heat, traditionally using ghee, and then subjected to long, slow cooking using moist heat and a minimum of added liquid. The pot may be sealed with dough during the last stages of cooking, using a technique called dum or dampokhtak.

The korma can make use of a technique called bagar: later in the cooking, additional spices are mixed with heated ghee and then combined with the sauce formed by the braising; the pan is then covered and shaken to release steam and mix the contents.

There is a wide variation between individual korma and other "curry" recipes. Chilli and ginger are often used, but the precise method of preparation results in widely different flavors. Indian bay leaves or dried coconut may be added, the latter being a predominantly South Indian flavoring.

A korma pilau (pilaf) is a rice and meat dish made with braised meat.

Variations

In the United Kingdom

In the United Kingdom, a typical korma as served in curry houses is a mildly spiced dish with a thick sauce. It often features almonds, cashews or other nuts, and coconut or coconut milk. In the 21st century, chicken korma has several times been cited as the most popular curry in the UK, replacing chicken tikka masala in surveys of public eating habits.

Navratan korma

Navratan korma is a vegetarian korma made with vegetables and either paneer (an Indian cheese) or nuts – or sometimes both. Navratan means "nine gems", and it is common for the recipe to include nine different vegetables.

Eid korma 
In some parts of South Asia, korma is used to denote a traditional Eid al-Adha (festival of the sacrifice) dish of lamb, goat or cow that is braised in minimal or no spices. The flavour comes from the meat and fat of the chosen cuts. It was often done to preserve meats for a short-term period, as the fat layer forms a barrier to help prevent spoilage, similar to potted beef.

In Malaysia 
Korma or 'gulai kurma' in Malaysia is cooked with coconut milk instead of yogurt. Meats used for kurma include chicken, mutton, beef and deer.

See also

References and notes

External links
 

Bengali curries
Indian curries
Mughlai cuisine
Muhajir cuisine
Pakistani curries
Pakistani chicken dishes
Telangana cuisine
Uttar Pradeshi cuisine
Foods containing coconut
Nut dishes
Anglo-Indian cuisine
Bangladeshi cuisine
Pakistani cuisine